The Lutheran Church in Singapore (LCS) is a Lutheran denomination in Singapore. Constituted in 1997, it currently has approximately 2,834 members in 7 congregations nationwide.

The current bishop of the LCS is the Rt. Rev. Lu Guan Hoe.

History

Early history

The Lutheran Church in Singapore shares its early history with the Lutheran Church in Malaysia and Singapore (LCMS). In 1960, the American Lutheran mission in Malaya built a church at Duke's Road in Bukit Timah together with two other small Lutheran congregations from the Tamil Evangelical Lutheran Church and the Huria Kristen Batak Protestant in Singapore. Worship services in English, Chinese, Tamil and Batak were held in the church. With the onset of the Indonesia–Malaysia confrontation, many of the Batak members returned to Indonesia in 1963 and the remaining Batak parishioners decided to worship at the Methodist Church in Short Street.

In 1963, a second congregation was established in Queenstown and the mission was able to obtain one of the six religious sites allocated in Queenstown through the help of a member of the Batak congregation. The congregations in Singapore were grouped as the Singapore District, one of the three constituent districts of the LCMS.

Towards autonomy

By 1973, the then President of the LCMS, Dr. Carl Fisher raised the question of whether the Lutheran churches in Singapore would operate as a national church separate from the LCMS. The matter was not pursued further until 1984, when the matter was brought up again during a meeting with the Singapore District Council of the LCMS. Even then, this matter was again not pursued further.

In February 1990, the issue of an independent Lutheran Church in Singapore was again brought into discussion by the Executive Council of the LCMS. This time the issue was given more serious thought, particularly since it was noted that the clergy representing the Singapore District in the LCMS' Executive Council were both not Singaporean citizens. One of the results of this discussion was the establishment of a Restructuring Committee to study the restructuring of the Lutheran Church in Malaysia and Singapore. Each district of the LCMS was also to form its own ad hoc committee to study the matter.

A meeting was convened on the 1st and 2 April 1991 as the LCMS Restructuring Consultation in Port Dickson, Malaysia to present the combined studies and recommendations. It was agreed in principle that the Singapore District would function as a fully autonomous Singaporean Lutheran Church, working side by side with her Malaysian counterpart. A ten-year time frame was adopted in which the Lutheran Church in Singapore and the Lutheran Church in Malaysia would initially be re-organised as two synods within one Church organisation and move towards independence as two national churches by 2001.

Establishment of a national church

Despite the ten year time frame, the process was accelerated and in 1997, the Lutheran Church in Singapore was constituted as a separate national body for Lutheran churches in Singapore with the Rt. Rev. John Tan Yok Han elected as the first Bishop of the church.

Structure and organisation

The Lutheran Church in Singapore' structure evolved from being the Southern District of the Lutheran Church in Malaysia and Singapore to a national body. The highest decision-making body is the Annual Meeting consisting of elected lay and ordained voting members from each congregation that meets annually and headed by a bishop. When the Annual Meeting is in recess, authority is delegated to the executive council.

The Ministerium, consisting of the ordained pastors of the church, attends to matters of doctrine, nurture and spiritual care. On the local congregation level, local church councils run the various LCS congregations. All properties of the local congregations are owned by the LCS.

Bishops of the LCS

1997-2009
Rev. John Tan Yok Han

2009–2021
Rev. Terry Kee Buck Hwa

2021-2022
Rev. Lu Guan Hoe

Congregations

At present, there are 6 congregations in Singapore:

 Bedok Lutheran Church, Bedok
 Jurong Christian Church, Jurong
 Lutheran Church of Our Redeemer, Bukit Timah
 Queenstown Lutheran Church, Queenstown
 Yishun Christian Church, Yishun
 Thai Good News Centre, Beach Road

Affiliations

The LCS participates actively in ecumenical relationships through:

National Council of Churches of Singapore
Christian Conference of Asia
World Council of Churches
Federation of Evangelical Lutheran Churches in Malaysia & Singapore
Basel Christian Church of Malaysia
Evangelical Lutheran Church in Malaysia
Lutheran Church in Malaysia
Protestant Church in Sabah
Lutheran World Federation
Asia Lutheran Communion

The LCS also works in partnership with:

Evangelical Lutheran Church in America, Southeastern Synod
Evangelical Lutheran Church in Bavaria
Lutheran Church of Australia
Finnish Evangelical Lutheran Mission

See also

 Christianity in Singapore
 Lutheran Church in Malaysia and Singapore

References

External links
 Lutheran Church in Singapore

Protestantism in Singapore
Christian organizations established in 1997
Singapore
Singapore
Singapore